The North Santiam River is a  tributary of the Santiam River in western Oregon in the United States. It drains  of the Cascade Range on the eastern side of the Willamette Valley east of Salem.

It rises in the high Cascades in eastern Linn county, northwest of Three Fingered Jack in the Willamette National Forest. It flows north through the mountains past Marion Forks, receiving the drainage from the western slope of Mount Jefferson. Near Mount Jefferson it turns sharply west, descending through a canyon past  Idanha and Detroit to Niagara County Park where the valley begins to widen and some agriculture use begins. Continuing west, the river flows past Gates, Mill City and Mehama.

It is impounded by Detroit Dam in the mountains west of Detroit to form Detroit Lake for flood control. Detroit Lake State Park is along the northern shore of the lake.

In the 19th century, the canyon of the North Santiam River provided a formidable obstacle to settlers. The construction of a railroad in 1887 opened up the canyon to settlement and logging of the surrounding mountains.

Fauna
Blocked by Big Cliff Dam near Mill City, the lower North Santiam River supports spring chinook salmon and summer steelhead. In the reaches upstream of the dam, the river is managed mainly as a stocked-trout fishery. Near the stream's source at Santiam Lake in the Mount Jefferson Wilderness, native cutthroat trout, rainbow trout, and introduced brook trout are also found.

The headwaters of Marion Creek, a tributary of the North Santiam River, originate at Marion Lake, which is a location of many wildlife species. This headwaters area is a breeding location for amphibians including the rough-skinned newt.

Watershed
Ten cities draw their drinking water from the North Santiam watershed: Detroit, Gates, Idanha, Jefferson, Lyons, Mehama, Mill City, Salem, Stayton, and Turner.

See also
List of rivers of Oregon
Willamette Riverkeeper

References

External links
 
 North Santiam Watershed Council
 South Santiam Watershed Council
 Willamette Riverkeeper

Rivers of Oregon
Rivers of Marion County, Oregon
Rivers of Linn County, Oregon
Willamette National Forest